Space mathematics may refer to:
 Orbital mechanics
 Newton's laws of motion
 Newton's law of universal gravitation
 Space (mathematics)